The 2020 Carlow Senior Football Championship is the 120th edition of the Carlow GAA's premier club gaelic football tournament for senior graded clubs in County Carlow, Ireland. The tournament consists of 8 teams, with the winner going on to represent Carlow in the Leinster Senior Club Football Championship. The championship starts with a group stage and then progresses to a knock out stage.

Éire Óg were the defending champions after they defeated Palatine in the previous years final.

This was O'Hanrahans return to the senior grade after claiming the 2019 Carlow Intermediate Football Championship title, thus ending a 3-year exodus since being relegated in 2017. There was no Relegation Playoff in 2020 due to COVID-19.

Team changes

The following teams have changed division since the 2018 championship season.

To S.F.C.
Promoted from 2019 Carlow Intermediate Football Championship
 O'Hanrahans -  (Intermediate Champions)

From S.F.C.
Relegated to 2019 Carlow Intermediate Football Championship
 Ballinabranna

Group stage

There are two groups of four teams. The top two teams in each group compete in the semi-finals. The bottom team in each group compete in the relegation Final.

Group A

Round 1
 Mount Leinster Rangers 1-13, 2-7 O'Hanrahans, 6/9/2020.
 Éire Óg 1-12, 0-5 Bagenalstown Gaels, 4/9/2020.

Round 2
 Éire Óg 2-7, 0-4 Mount Leinster Rangers, 13/9/2020.
 O'Hanrahans 2-12, 1-11 Bagenalstown Gaels, 13/9/2020.

Round 3
 Mount Leinster Rangers 0-12, 1-8 Bagenalstown Gaels, 20/9/2020.
 Éire Óg 1-14, 0-9 O'Hanrahans, 18/9/2020.

Group B

Round 1
 Rathvilly 0-15, 1-05 Palatine, 6/9/2020. 
 Old Leighlin 0-6, 0-5 Tinryland, 5/9/2020.

Round 2
 Rathvilly 3-12, 0-8 Tinryland, 12/9/2020. 
 Palatine 1-12, 0-7 Old Leighlin,  11/9/2020.

Round 3
 Rathvilly 1-9, 1-4 Old Leighlin, 19/9/2020.
 Palatine 5-9, 0-8 Tinryland, 20/9/2020.

Knock-out stages

Finals
The winners and runners up of each group qualify for the quarter finals.

Quarter-finals

Semi-finals

Final

Relegation play off
There was no relegation playoff in the 2020 Championship due to the impact of the COVID-19 pandemic on Gaelic games.

Leinster Senior Club Football Championship
There was no Leinster Club Championship in 2020 due to the impact of the COVID-19 pandemic on Gaelic games.

References

 
 
 

Carlow Senior Football Championship
Carlow Senior Football Championship
Carlow SFC